Robert Henry Gebhard (born January 3, 1943) is an American front-office executive in Major League Baseball and a former right-handed pitcher for the Minnesota Twins and Montreal Expos.

Career

As a player
Born in Lamberton, Minnesota, Gebhard attended the University of Iowa. During his playing career, he stood 6'2" (1.88 m) tall, weighed 210 pounds (95 kg), and batted right-handed. Gebhard was selected by the Twins in the 44th round of the first-ever baseball amateur draft in 1965, but he didn't reach the Twins until the age of 28, on August 2, when he hurled two scoreless innings against the Chicago White Sox. He appeared in 30 games over the 1971 and  seasons with Minnesota, then was signed as a free agent by the Expos in January 1974. He appeared in one game for Montreal on September 3, giving up one earned run and five hits in two innings pitched. All told, Gebhard compiled a record of one win, three defeats and an earned run average of 5.93 over 31 games and 41 innings of Major League play.

In the front office
He was a coach on the Expos' Major League staff in 1982, and then served as the club's farm system director from 1983–86. He then returned to the Twins to become assistant general manager under Andy MacPhail, working with Minnesota during its  and  world championship seasons, before becoming the first GM in Rockies' history during the 1991–92 offseason.

He supervised the building of the Rockies' farm system during , ran the expansion draft for them, and hired Don Baylor as the club's first manager. The early years of the Rockies were successful at the gate and on the field. In , they set a Major League attendance record of 4.483 million fans in their maiden season at Mile High Stadium, led both leagues in attendance four times, and drew over 3.2 million fans every year during Gebhard's tenure. However, successive losing campaigns in 1998–99, amplified by the Rockies' pitching staff's struggles at Coors Field, resulted in rampant speculation in late 1999 that Gebhard would be replaced as general manager. In response, he turned in his resignation on August 20.

Gebhard then moved to the St. Louis Cardinals as vice president and top assistant to general manager Walt Jocketty from 2000–04, then joined the Arizona Diamondbacks as interim general manager between Joe Garagiola Jr. and Josh Byrnes from August to October . He then was the D-Backs' vice president and assistant to the general manager for several years before returning to the Cardinals as special assistant to GM John Mozeliak in 2016.

References

External links

1943 births
Living people
American expatriate baseball players in Canada
Arizona Diamondbacks executives
Baseball coaches from Minnesota
Baseball players from Minnesota
Charlotte Hornets (baseball) players
Colorado Rockies executives
Evansville Triplets players
Major League Baseball farm directors
Major League Baseball general managers
Major League Baseball pitchers
Major League Baseball pitching coaches
Memphis Blues players
Minnesota Twins players
Minnesota Twins executives
Montreal Expos coaches
Montreal Expos players
People from Lamberton, Minnesota
Portland Beavers players
St. Cloud Rox players
St. Louis Cardinals executives
Tacoma Twins players
Wilson Tobs players